Trymalitis cataracta is a species of moth of the family Tortricidae first described by Edward Meyrick in 1907. It is found in Sri Lanka, Australia, New Guinea, Bismarck Archipelago, Caroline Islands, Fiji, Java, Siam, Andaman Islands, Africa and Madagascar.

References

Moths described in 1907
Chlidanotini